Cryptops dilagus is a species of centipede in the Cryptopidae family. It is endemic to New Zealand. It was first described in 1921 by New Zealand zoologist Gilbert Archey.

Distribution
The species occurs in the South Island. The type locality is Mount Algidus in the western Canterbury Region.

References

 

 
dilagus
Centipedes of New Zealand
Animals described in 1921
Taxa named by Gilbert Archey